The Kooralbyn International School (TKIS) is an independent, co-educational, boarding and day school, located in Kooralbyn, about 64 km south of Brisbane, Queensland, Australia. TKIS is the only school in Australia to have produced two Young Australian of the Year recipients (Cathy Freeman and Scott Hocknull).

History
The school was founded in 1985, at a site on the banks of Cannon Creek now known as the 'Lower campus'. However, in the mid-1990s, it was largely relocated to a nearby hillside after flooding incidents in 1990 and 1991 caused extensive damage to the school. A wooden pillar from one of the school's original buildings still stands on the grounds, as a monument to these events.

The original TKIS closed in 2002 due to funding issues. In 2004 TKIS was re-opened with a new Board, Principal (Geoff Mills), new staff and new financial backing.

Former school principal of the original school Bryan Andrew and other senior staff members are also responsible for the creation of the Spring Hill-based company 'International Education Services' (IES). This company has, since 1998 successfully run the University of Queensland's Foundation Year program in Spring Hill.

Notable alumni
 Steven Bowditch, golfer, class of 2000
Andrew Buckle, golfer, class of 1999
Jason Day, golfer, class of 2002
Cathy Freeman OAM, athlete, class of 1990
 Scott Hocknull, palaeontologist, class of 1994
Rajnesh Singh, businessperson and engineer
Adam Scott, golfer, class of 1997
 Lev Susany, Australian powerlifter and Commonwealth record holder, class of 1996

See also
List of schools in Queensland

References

External links
 The Kooralbyn International School Website

Private schools in Queensland
High schools in Queensland
Schools in South East Queensland
Boarding schools in Queensland
Educational institutions established in 1985
1985 establishments in Australia